Scout toujours... is a French comedy film directed by Gérard Jugnot and released in 1985.

Plot 
The film starts in June 1965. Deciding to get rid of their tyrannic leaders they nicknamed "Diên Biên Phu" because of his obsessions of sergeant instructor, a troop of scouts from Île-de-France spoil the Scout Promise ceremony. Back in Paris, they even put out of race their leader by letting him fall in a manhole cover.

In Summer 1965, it is finally to Jean-Baptiste Foucret, nicknamed "Biquet" by a too invading mother, that is given the big responsibility to bring a turbulent troop in a summer camp. But if the father of Jean-Baptiste was known for being a scout and an exceptional scout leader, his son is far to become like him. Without an experience as a leader, without a real authority and without real support from his assistants, "Biquet" is exceeded by the events. The scouts made of him their punchbag, and that they are far of being nice with him.

From the bus fire to the revolt of the Impalas patrol, Jean-Baptiste will have to compose with the chaplain's father, not always easy, the chaplain's sister, with light mores, and Édith, a woman of the village with even lighter mores. In addition of the Gypsies with whom the relationships are not always easy, the countrymen who cannot stand anymore the tricks of the scouts, and the scouts themselves, never without new ideas, who will make him live the worst situations ever lived.

Cast

Scout leaders 
 Gérard Jugnot ... Jean-Baptiste Foucret
 Jean-Claude Leguay ... Georges
 Éric Prat ... Pschitt

Guillemin family 
 Jean Rougerie ... Benoît de Guillemin, the father
 Jean-Paul Comart ... Thierry de Guillemin, the young priest
 Agnès Blanchot ... Marie-France de Guillemin

Scouts 
 Cédric Dumond ... Étienne
 Julien Dubois ... Fla Fla
 Guillaume Pétraud ... Joseph Benamou
 Guillaume Cabrère ... Louis Bardinski
 Robert Sirvent ... Nodet Langlois
 Franck Beaujour ... Pois chiche
 Stéphane Thil ... Emmanuel
 Romain Soler ... Anthony
 Fabien Remblier ... Jacky
 Louis Leterrier ... Tommy

Other characters 
 Maurice Barrier ... Marek the Gypsy
 Sophie Grimaldi ... Madeleine Foucret
 Jean-Yves Chatelais ... Bien bien fou
 Philippe Ogouz ... De la Motte
 Bernard Cazassus ... the countryman
 Nicole Felix ... Édith

About the film 
 It is the second film directed by Gérard Jugnot, one year after Pinot simple flic.

External links 

 

1985 films
French comedy films
Films set in the 1960s
Films shot in Paris
Films about school violence
Scouting in popular culture
Films directed by Gérard Jugnot
1980s French films